Benecko is a municipality and village in Semily District in the Liberec Region of the Czech Republic. It has about 1,100 inhabitants. It is a winter tourist resort. The village of Horní Štěpanice with timbered cottages is protected by law as a village monument reservation.

Administrative parts

Villages and hamlets of Dolní Štěpanice, Horní Štěpanice, Mrklov, Rychlov, Štěpanická Lhota, Zákoutí and Žalý are administrative parts of Benecko.

Geography
It lies in the Giant Mountains.

History
The area has been site to multiple settlements over time. The first recorded original historical centre of habitation was Horní Štěpanice, a small settlement established near the castle Štěpanice. The first written mention of Horní Štěpanice is from 1304, when the castle was inhabited by Jan of Waldstein. The latest archaeological findings point to older occupation of the site in 1254 by Jindřich of Waldstein. Horní Štěpanice had town status until 1524 when the castle was abandoned.

Benecko is firstly mentioned in 1628 as "Bennešsko", meaning the residency of Beneš. The name is also said to be derived from a local legend about a hermit of Benedikt order, whose hermitage was located near Jindra rock near the site of the modern Chapel of Saint Hubert.

People settled other areas of the municipality in the 17th–19th centuries and built an economy based on farming, hand weaving and the manufacture of jewellery. At the end of the 19th century, tourism and winter sports were developed, with rich tourists bringing economic wealth and new industries to the area. This development was interrupted by the World War II. In the second half of 20th century, most of businesses were nationalized and tourism lessened in importance. The next wave of prosperity started after 1989 with restitution of properties following the Velvet Revolution.

Economy
Economic activities of local population were changed many times. Initially, the economy was based on farming and mining. After the coal reserves were exhausted, the people turned to industries like wood mining, glassblowing and textile processing. The current economy of Benecko is mostly oriented towards tourism and related activities. The municipality to home to many hotels, private holiday accommodations, ski schools and equipment rental, with little industry, including the small company Delfi in Dolní Štěpanice.

Transport
Benecko has bus connection with Vrchlabí, Jilemnice and on Friday and Saturday with Prague. In the main tourist season there are also cyclobuses between Pec pod Sněžkou and Harrachov.

Culture
Despite its remoteness, Benecko has a rich cultural life with amateur theatre and musical associations.

Sport

Sights

The parish Church of the Holy Trinity in Horní Štěpanice is a rural church in the Empire style. Its current appearance dates from 1812.

In Dolní Štěpanice, there is a ruin of the Štěpanice Castle. The Gothic castle from the second half of the 13th century was referred to as desolate in 1543. Today, the locality consists of the remains of stone walls with a prismatic bastion.

It is the only stone observation tower in the Giant Mountains. It was built by Count Harrach in 1892. The place is also a pilgrimage site.

Notable people
Šárka Strachová (born 1985), alpine ski racer, Olympic medalist

References

External links

Official tourist portal

Villages in Semily District
Ski areas and resorts in the Czech Republic